Brenton James Langbein, AO (21 January 1928 – 6 June 1993) was an Australian violinist, conductor, and composer.

Life
Langbein was born on 21 January 1928 in the South Australian town of Gawler to James Langbein, an accomplished pianist who had set up a car dealership and garage business in Gawler, and his second wife, Juanita Zadow. His parents were of German and Scottish ancestry, his father's grandfather, Joachim Heinrich Gottfried Langbein, having arrived in South Australia from Mecklenburg in 1845. He began learning violin at age five with the teaching sisters of the Good Samaritan Convert, Gawler, and when he was eight years old, he gave his first public recital at Tanunda Town Hall. He studied violin at the Elder Conservatorium of Music under Sylvia Whitington and at age nine won a Eugene Alderman Scholarship for a further three years' tuition at the Conservatorium, where he was taught by Ludwig Schwab, and began to perform with the Adelaide Symphony Orchestra at age fourteen. He attended Gawler High School and graduated from the University of Adelaide with a Bachelor of Music. In 1948 he moved to Sydney, where he performed as a soloist and as a member of the Sydney Symphony Orchestra and studied composition with Sir Eugene Goosens.

He moved to Switzerland in 1951 to study with Paul Grümmer; during this period he was also taught by Pablo Casals and spent six weeks studying in Vienna with Ernst Morawec. In 1953 he settled in Zürich, where he became a member of Paul Sacher's Collegium Musicum Zürich chamber orchestra in 1954 and its concertmaster two years after that; he later became the concertmaster of Sacher's Basel Chamber Orchestra. He was appointed Professor of Violin at the City of Basel Music Academy, and formed a duo with Australian pianist Maureen Jones and then a trio with fellow Australian horn player Barry Tuckwell. In the 1960s he founded Die Kammermusiker Zürich, a chamber orchestra that performed music by little-known and contemporary composers, along with youth orchestra schools in Zürich and Basel.

He was the soloist at the premiere of Hans Werner Henze's Violin Concerto No. 2, which was dedicated to Langbein, at the 1972 Adelaide Festival of Arts and co-founded Opera Factory later in the 1970s. He was the musical director of the Adelaide Chamber Orchestra and co-founded the Barossa Festival, a chamber music festival in South Australia's Barossa Valley, in 1990.

Langbein gave his last concert in Siena, Italy, in early April 1993. He died of cancer in Zürich on 6 June of that year, aged 65, and is buried in the Barossa Valley town of Lyndoch.

Recognition and legacy
Langbein received an award of honour from the Canton of Zürich in 1983 and the Nageli Medal from the City of Zürich, an award for musicians that he had co-founded, in 1988. In the 1986 Queen's Birthday Honours he was made an Officer of the Order of Australia (AO) for service to music. The Brenton Langbein Theatre, part of the Barossa Convention Centre in Tanunda, is named after him, as is the Langbein String Quartet, run by the Firm, a South Australian contemporary music organisation. Hans Werner Henze wrote a solo viola composition, An Brenton, as a tribute to Langbein shortly after his death. His papers and other ephemera were donated to the Mortlock Library at the State Library of South Australia.

Among Langbein's compositions, a string quintet has been recorded. His only composition with an opus number is his Prelude, Marche & Valse, Op. 1. Manuscripts of his compositions are among his papers at the State Library of South Australia.

References

Australian male composers
Australian composers
Australian conductors (music)
Australian classical violinists
Male classical violinists
20th-century conductors (music)
20th-century classical violinists
20th-century Australian male musicians
20th-century Australian musicians
Officers of the Order of Australia
People from Gawler, South Australia
University of Adelaide alumni
Musicians from South Australia
Musicians from Zürich
Australian expatriates in Switzerland
Deaths from cancer in Switzerland
1928 births
1993 deaths